The 2004–05 Ranji Trophy was the 71st season of the Ranji Trophy. Railways defeated Punjab on first innings lead in the final.

Knockout stage

Assam v Baroda at Guwahati - Nov 7–10, 2004

Assam 273 and 360/4; Baroda 347
ScorecardMatch drawn
Bengal v Karnataka at Kolkata - Nov 7–10, 2004

Bengal 315 and 206; Karnataka 179 and 226
ScorecardBengal won by 116 runs
Gujarat v Delhi at Ahmedabad - Nov 7–10, 2004

Gujarat 214 and 372; Delhi 430/8d and 102/9
ScorecardMatch drawn
Madhya Pradesh v Andhra at Indore - Nov 7–10, 2004

Andhra 361 and 195/3; Madhya Pradesh 287
ScorecardMatch drawn
Punjab v Uttar Pradesh at Mohali - Nov 7–10, 2004

Uttar Pradesh 269 and 317/8d; Punjab 308 and 164/5
ScorecardMatch drawn
Railways v Mumbai at Delhi - Nov 7–10, 2004

Mumbai 361 and 221/3; Railways 284
ScorecardMatch drawn
Tamil Nadu v Hyderabad (India) at Chennai - Nov 7–10, 2004

Hyderabad (India) 163 and 190; Tamil Nadu 461/6d
ScorecardTamil Nadu won by an innings and 108 runs
Delhi v Andhra at Delhi - Nov 16–19, 2004

Delhi 491/9d; Andhra 311 and 152/5 (f/o)
ScorecardMatch drawn
Jammu & Kashmir v Orissa at Srinagar - Nov 16–20, 2004

Orissa 325 and 98/2; Jammu & Kashmir 123 and 299 (f/o)
ScorecardOrissa won by 8 wickets
Karnataka v Gujarat at Bangalore - Nov 16–19, 2004

Gujarat 330 and 307/4d; Karnataka 272 and 156/7
ScorecardMatch drawn
Kerala v Himachal Pradesh at Palakkad - Nov 16–19, 2004

Himachal Pradesh 465 and 187/7d; Kerala 215 and 290/6
ScorecardMatch drawn
Maharashtra v Baroda at Pune - Nov 16–19, 2004

Baroda 446 and 189/1; Maharashtra 387
ScorecardMatch drawn
Mumbai v Madhya Pradesh at Mumbai - Nov 16–19, 2004

Madhya Pradesh 255 and 222; Mumbai 233 and 81/4
ScorecardMatch drawn
Punjab v Assam at Amritsar - Nov 16–19, 2004

Punjab 422; Assam 213 and 158 (f/o)
ScorecardPunjab won by an innings and 51 runs
Railways v Bengal at Delhi - Nov 16–19, 2004

Railways 348 and 217/6d; Bengal 255 and 212/5
ScorecardMatch drawn
Saurashtra v Jharkhand at Rajkot - Nov 16–19, 2004

Saurashtra 274 and 279/6; Jharkhand 358/9d
ScorecardMatch drawn
Services v Goa at Delhi - Nov 16–19, 2004

Services 507/5d; Goa 244 and 269/4 (f/o)
ScorecardMatch drawn
Tripura v Haryana at Agartala - Nov 16–19, 2004

Haryana 200 and 437/5; Tripura 288
ScorecardMatch drawn
Uttar Pradesh v Tamil Nadu at Lucknow - Nov 16–19, 2004

Tamil Nadu 353; Uttar Pradesh 136 and 157/8 (f/o)
ScorecardMatch drawn
Vidarbha v Rajasthan at Nagpur - Nov 16–18, 2004

Rajasthan 101 and 151; Vidarbha 157 and 96/3
ScorecardVidarbha won by 7 wickets
Bengal v Gujarat at Siliguri - Nov 25–28, 2004

Bengal 298 and 279/6d; Gujarat 361 and 217/8
ScorecardGujarat won by 2 wickets
Delhi v Railways at Delhi - Nov 25–28, 2004

Delhi 216 and 395/4; Railways 201
ScorecardMatch drawn
Haryana v Goa at Gurgaon - Nov 25–28, 2004

Haryana 293 and 188/6d; Goa 165 and 163
ScorecardHaryana won by 153 runs
Himachal Pradesh v Saurashtra at Dharamsala - Nov 25–28, 2004

Saurashtra 268 and 153; Himachal Pradesh 140 and 282/6
ScorecardHimachal Pradesh won by 4 wickets
Hyderabad (India) v Maharashtra at Hyderabad - Nov 25–27, 2004

Hyderabad (India) 231 and 170; Maharashtra 83 and 233
ScorecardHyderabad (India) won by 85 runs
Jharkhand v Jammu & Kashmir at Jamshedpur - Nov 25–27, 2004

Jammu & Kashmir 79 and 176; Jharkhand 245 and 11/0
ScorecardJharkhand won by 10 wickets
Karnataka v Madhya Pradesh at Bangalore - Nov 25–28, 2004

Karnataka 619/5d; Madhya Pradesh 422 and 152/6 (f/o)
ScorecardMatch drawn
Kerala v Orissa at Palakkad - Nov 25–28, 2004

Kerala 324 and 149/8d; Orissa 334 and 47/3
ScorecardMatch drawn
Mumbai v Andhra at Mumbai - Nov 25–28, 2004

Mumbai 515/9d; Andhra 116 and 278 (f/o)
ScorecardMumbai won by an innings and 121 runs
Punjab v Baroda at Mohali - Nov 25–28, 2004

Punjab 175 and 370/4d; Baroda 155 and 280
ScorecardPunjab won by 110 runs
Services v Rajasthan at Delhi - Nov 25–28, 2004

Rajasthan 290 and 326/5; Services 441/8d
ScorecardMatch drawn
Uttar Pradesh v Assam at Kanpur - Nov 25–27, 2004

Assam 184 and 107; Uttar Pradesh 132 and 163/2
ScorecardUttar Pradesh won by 8 wickets
Vidarbha v Tripura at Nagpur - Nov 25–27, 2004

Tripura 91 and 164; Vidarbha 154 and 102/4
ScorecardVidarbha won by 6 wickets
Assam v Tamil Nadu at Guwahati - Dec 4–7, 2004

Tamil Nadu 485/5d and 224/4; Assam 430
ScorecardMatch drawn
Bengal v Mumbai at Kolkata - Dec 4–7, 2004

Mumbai 552/7d; Bengal 239 and 181 (f/o)
ScorecardMumbai won by an innings and 132 runs
Delhi v Madhya Pradesh at Delhi - Dec 4–7, 2004

Delhi 239/9d and 227; Madhya Pradesh 294 and 156/8
ScorecardMatch drawn
Goa v Vidarbha at Margao - Dec 4–7, 2004

Goa 371 and 211; Vidarbha 300 and 117
ScorecardGoa won by 165 runs
Gujarat v Railways at Ahmedabad - Dec 4–7, 2004

Gujarat 384 and 227/5; Railways 200
ScorecardMatch drawn
Himachal Pradesh v Orissa at Dharamsala - Dec 4–7, 2004

Himachal Pradesh 425; Orissa 80 and 302 (f/o)
ScorecardHimachal Pradesh won by an innings and 43 runs
Hyderabad (India) v Baroda at Hyderabad - Dec 4–7, 2004

Hyderabad (India) 170 and 198; Baroda 93 and 279/5
ScorecardBaroda won by 5 wickets
Jharkhand v Kerala at Jamshedpur - Dec 4–7, 2004

Kerala 321 and 161; Jharkhand 315 and 16/2
ScorecardMatch drawn
Karnataka v Andhra at Bangalore - Dec 4–7, 2004

Andhra 237 and 245; Karnataka 328 and 158/5
ScorecardKarnataka won by 5 wickets
Punjab v Maharashtra at Mohali - Dec 4–6, 2004

Maharashtra 123 and 205; Punjab 566/4d
ScorecardPunjab won by an innings and 238 runs
Rajasthan v Tripura at Jaipur - Dec 4–7, 2004

Tripura 108 and 116; Rajasthan 338
ScorecardRajasthan won by an innings and 114 runs
Saurashtra v Jammu & Kashmir at Rajkot - Dec 4–7, 2004

Jammu & Kashmir 505/9d and 3/0; Saurashtra 596
ScorecardMatch drawn
Services v Haryana at Delhi - Dec 4–7, 2004

Haryana 435; Services 185 and 231 (f/o)
ScorecardHaryana won by an innings and 19 runs
Andhra v Bengal at Visakhapatnam - Dec 13–16, 2004

Bengal 234 and 144; Andhra 188 and 193/6
ScorecardAndhra won by 4 wickets
Delhi v Karnataka at Delhi - Dec 13–16, 2004

Delhi 427/7d and 115/1d; Karnataka 292 and 201/7
ScorecardMatch drawn
Himachal Pradesh v Jammu & Kashmir at Dharamsala - Dec 13–15, 2004

Jammu & Kashmir 93 and 158; Himachal Pradesh 370
ScorecardHimachal Pradesh won by an innings and 119 runs
Hyderabad (India) v Uttar Pradesh at Hyderabad - Dec 13–16, 2004

Hyderabad (India) 246 and 221; Uttar Pradesh 325 and 120
ScorecardHyderabad (India) won by 22 runs
Jharkhand v Orissa at Jamshedpur - Dec 13–16, 2004

Orissa 110 and 294; Jharkhand 268 and 137/4
ScorecardJharkhand won by 6 wickets
Kerala v Saurashtra at Palakkad - Dec 13–14, 2004

Kerala 117 and 114; Saurashtra 260
ScorecardSaurashtra won by an innings and 29 runs
Madhya Pradesh v Railways at Indore - Dec 13–16, 2004

Railways 373 and 82/4; Madhya Pradesh 207 and 303 (f/o)
ScorecardMatch drawn
Maharashtra v Assam at Aurangabad - Dec 13–15, 2004

Assam 201 and 153; Maharashtra 400
ScorecardMaharashtra won by an innings and 46 runs
Mumbai v Gujarat at Mumbai - Dec 13–16, 2004

Gujarat 232 and 171; Mumbai 467
ScorecardMumbai won by an innings and 64 runs
Rajasthan v Goa at Jaipur - Dec 13–16, 2004

Goa 198 and 348/9d; Rajasthan 227 and 214/5
ScorecardMatch drawn
Tamil Nadu v Punjab at Chennai - Dec 13–16, 2004

Tamil Nadu 244 and 408/9; Punjab 218
ScorecardMatch drawn
Tripura v Services at Agartala - Dec 13–16, 2004

Tripura 237 and 196; Services 422 and 14/0
ScorecardServices won by 10 wickets
Vidarbha v Haryana at Nagpur - Dec 13–16, 2004

Haryana 154 and 230; Vidarbha 57 and 286
ScorecardHaryana won by 41 runs
Andhra v Railways at Anantapur - Dec 22–25, 2004

Railways 263 and 270/4d; Andhra 202 and 198
ScorecardRailways won by 133 runs
Baroda v Tamil Nadu at Vadodara - Dec 22–24, 2004

Tamil Nadu 152 and 183; Baroda 64 and 272/6
ScorecardBaroda won by 4 wickets
Bengal v Delhi at Kolkata - Dec 22–25, 2004

Bengal 240 and 232; Delhi 251 and 222/2
ScorecardDelhi won by 8 wickets
Gujarat v Madhya Pradesh at Ahmedabad - Dec 22–25, 2004

Gujarat 353 and 124/1; Madhya Pradesh 280
ScorecardMatch drawn
Hyderabad (India) v Punjab at Hyderabad - Dec 22–24, 2004

Hyderabad (India) 233 and 149; Punjab 105 and 217
ScorecardHyderabad (India) won by 60 runs
Jharkhand v Himachal Pradesh at Jamshedpur - Dec 22–25, 2004

Himachal Pradesh 275 and 120; Jharkhand 218 and 155
ScorecardHimachal Pradesh won by 22 runs
Kerala v Jammu & Kashmir at Palakkad - Dec 22–25, 2004

Kerala 319 and 281/7d; Jammu & Kashmir 140 and 299
ScorecardKerala won by 161 runs
Maharashtra v Uttar Pradesh at Karad - Dec 22–25, 2004

Maharashtra 394 and 119; Uttar Pradesh 282 and 234/5
ScorecardUttar Pradesh won by 5 wickets
Mumbai v Karnataka at Mumbai - Dec 22–25, 2004

Mumbai 292 and 264/8d; Karnataka 166 and 185
ScorecardMumbai won by 205 runs
Rajasthan v Haryana at Udaipur - Dec 22–25, 2004

Rajasthan 301 and 202; Haryana 412 and 92/1
ScorecardHaryana won by 9 wickets
Saurashtra v Orissa at Rajkot - Dec 22–24, 2004

Saurashtra 160 and 245; Orissa 349 and 59/0
ScorecardOrissa won by 10 wickets
Services v Vidarbha at Delhi - Dec 22–25, 2004

Vidarbha 184 and 50/1; Services 368
ScorecardMatch drawn
Tripura v Goa at Agartala - Dec 22–25, 2004

Goa 278 and 190/8; Tripura 211
ScorecardMatch drawn
Andhra v Gujarat at Visakhapatnam - Dec 31, 2004 - Jan 3, 2005

Gujarat 420 and 189; Andhra 314 and 222/7
ScorecardMatch drawn
Baroda v Uttar Pradesh at Vadodara - Dec 31, 2004 - Jan 3, 2005

Baroda 186 and 283; Uttar Pradesh 124 and 203
ScorecardBaroda won by 142 runs
Bengal v Madhya Pradesh at Kolkata - Dec 31, 2004 - Jan 3, 2005

Madhya Pradesh 392 and 111/2; Bengal 397
ScorecardMatch drawn
Hyderabad (India) v Assam at Secunderabad - Dec 31, 2004 - Jan 2, 2005

Hyderabad (India) 340; Assam 158 and 126 (f/o)
ScorecardHyderabad (India) won by an innings and 56 runs
Karnataka v Railways at Bangalore - Dec 31, 2004 - Jan 3, 2005

Karnataka 194 and 241; Railways 299 and 137/3
ScorecardRailways won by 7 wickets
Mumbai v Delhi at Mumbai - Dec 31, 2004 - Jan 3, 2005

Delhi 394 and 37/1; Mumbai 600/9d
ScorecardMatch drawn
Tamil Nadu v Maharashtra at Chennai - Dec 31, 2004 - Jan 3, 2005

Tamil Nadu 277 and 259/8d; Maharashtra 175 and 170
ScorecardTamil Nadu won by 191 runs
Semi Final: Haryana v Jharkhand at Chandigarh - Mar 18–22, 2005

Haryana 453 and 26/0; Jharkhand 308
ScorecardMatch drawn
Semi Final: Mumbai v Punjab at Mumbai - Mar 18–21, 2005

Mumbai 251 and 168; Punjab 126 and 294/7
ScorecardPunjab won by 3 wickets
Semi Final: Himachal Pradesh v Services at Dharamsala - Mar 18–22, 2005

Himachal Pradesh 50/1
ScorecardMatch drawn
Semi Final: Railways v Hyderabad (India) at Delhi - Mar 18–20, 2005

Hyderabad (India) 166 and 170; Railways 180 and 160/3
ScorecardRailways won by 7 wickets
Final: Haryana v Services at Gurgaon - Mar 30-Apr 3, 2005

Haryana 342 and 312/8d; Services 191 and 157
ScorecardHaryana won by 306 runs
Final: Punjab v Railways at Mohali - Mar 30-Apr 3, 2005

Railways 355 and 471; Punjab 309 and 137/4
ScorecardMatch drawn

Semifinal 1

Semifinal 2

Final

Scorecards and averages
Cricketarchive

References

External links

2005 in Indian cricket
Ranji Trophy seasons
Domestic cricket competitions in 2004–05